Itamar Golan (Hebrew: איתמר גולן), born 3 August 1970 in Vilnius, Lithuania, is an Israeli pianist.

He emigrated to Israel with his parents at the age of one. He studied piano with Lara Vodovoz and Emmanuel Krazovsky and gave his first recital at the age of seven.

From 1985 to 1989, a scholarship from the America-Israel Cultural Foundation allowed him to continue his training in the United States at the New England Conservatory in Boston with Leonard Shure and Patricia Zander. He later studied chamber music with Chaim Taub.

He began his career as a soloist and chamber musician in the United States and Israel. He has performed live or on recordings with many musicians including Kyung Wha Chung, Janine Jansen, Barbara Hendricks, Maxim Vengerov, Shlomo Mintz, Mischa Maisky, Matt Haimovitz, Tabea Zimmermann, Ida Haendel and Julian Rachlin. He has performed in concert halls and festivals in or at Ravinia, Chicago, Tanglewood, Salzburg, Edinburgh, Verbier and Lucerne. He has also performed as a soloist with the Israel Philharmonic Orchestra and with the Berlin Philharmonic under the direction of Zubin Mehta.
From 1991 to 1994, he taught at the Manhattan School of Music in New York and is currently professor of chamber music at the Paris Conservatory.

References

Israeli classical pianists
21st-century French male classical pianists
Living people
1970 births
Academic staff of the Conservatoire de Paris
Soviet emigrants to Israel